Dirk Caspers (born 31 May 1980 in Duisburg) is a German former footballer.

Career
Caspers played for several clubs in North Rhine-Westphalia, including many reserve teams, and made 10 appearances in the 2. Bundesliga for Alemannia Aachen.

References

External links
 

1980 births
Living people
Borussia Mönchengladbach players
Alemannia Aachen players
SG Wattenscheid 09 players
SC Preußen Münster players
Bonner SC players
Rot-Weiss Essen players
FC Schalke 04 II players
Borussia Mönchengladbach II players
SC Fortuna Köln players
2. Bundesliga players
German footballers
Association football defenders
Sportspeople from Neuss
Footballers from North Rhine-Westphalia
21st-century German people